Jorge Rubén Cortada Soto (born 6 October 1984 in Isla de la Juventud, Cuba) is a Cuban actor and model. He is 190 cm (6ft 3in) tall.

Biography 

He was born in Isla de la Juventud, Cuba, on 6 October 1984.

He graduated of High School levels in the Vocational School Vladimir Ilich Lenin, popularly known as ‘La Lenin’. Later, in 2003 he signs up for Automatic Engineering at the University Cujae, although he did not finish his studies in the Technical High School José Antonio Echeverría in La Habana. He started his international career as Model 

He competed in tennis until he was fifteen.

His first experiences as an actor were two plays in Cuba under Humberto Rodríguez’s command. After that, he trained with the Argentinian master Fernando Piernas (gambe).

Filmography

Series

References

External links 

21st-century Cuban male actors
1984 births
Living people